Milton Wells (July 13, 1829 – April 10, 1906) was a Union Army officer during the American Civil War. This clergyman and teacher assisted in the recruitment of the 15th West Virginia Volunteer Infantry.  On October 16, 1862, he was commissioned a major. Wells was promoted to lieutenant colonel on August 20, 1864 and to colonel on October 14, 1864. He resigned his commission in the volunteers on April 6, 1865.  

In recognition of his service, on March 18, 1867, President Andrew Johnson nominated Wells for appointment to the grade of brevet brigadier general of volunteers, to rank from March 13, 1865, and the United States Senate confirmed the appointment on March 28, 1867.

After the war, he moved to Rock county, Wisconsin.

References

See also

List of American Civil War brevet generals (Union)

1829 births
1906 deaths
Union Army colonels